A Wilderness of Error is an FX documentary true crime five-part series premiered on September 25, 2020, directed by Academy Award-nominated film producer Marc Smerling. It is based on the book A Wilderness of Error: The Trials of Jeffrey MacDonald by Errol Morris.

Premise 
The series examines the case of Jeffrey MacDonald, an Army surgeon who was accused of murdering his wife and two daughters on February 17, 1970. He was convicted of the crime on August 29, 1979, and has been in prison since 1982. However, MacDonald maintains his innocence.

Cast

Main
 Chris Cartusciello as Freddy Kassab
 Clay Boulware as Joe McGinniss
 John Morgan as Jeffrey MacDonald
 Logan Stewarns as Jeffrey MacDonald
 Roger Hervas as Foreman
 Bryan King as Detective Prince Beasley
 Gina Mazzara as Helena Stoeckley

Recurring and guest 

 Audrey Nita Bennett as Mildred Kassab
 Catherine Dawson as Helena Stoeckley
 Paul Spriggs as Jeffrey MacDonald
 James Trenton as Bernie Segal
 Kalyn Altmeyer Colette MacDonald
 Avery Ilardi as Kimberly MacDonald
 Clyde Drew as Bobby Jones
 Ryan Lee Dunlab as CID Agent Mike Pickering
 Vince Eisenson as CID Agent Peter Kearns
 Frank Failla as Detective Butch Madden
 Nick Dietz as Colonel Warren Rock
 Dan Lerner as CID Chief Franz Grebner
 Cliff LoBrutto as Dennis Meehan
 Rashid Helper as Vernoy Kennedy
 Mark Daly as William Berryhill
 And Palladino as Jimmy Friar
 Hugo Salazar Jr. as CID Agent Hagan Rossi
 Rick J. Koch as Judge Franklin Dupree
 Edwin Bacher as Eddie Sigmon
 Joy Bridenbaker as Kathryn MacDonald

Episodes

Production 
In April 2020, Academy Award-nominated film producer Marc Smerling served as director for the series.

Release 
A Wilderness of Error premiered on FX on September 25, 2020. The first official trailer was released by FX on July 30, 2020.
It was released internationally on Disney + as Star Original Series.

References

External links
 
 

2020 American television series debuts
2020s American documentary television series
2020s American television miniseries
FX Networks original programming
True crime television series
Television shows based on books
Television series by Universal Content Productions
Television series by 20th Century Fox Television